Teresa Mariani (24 October 1868 – 1 August 1914) was an Italian actress.

Early life 
Mariani was born into a family of performers in Florence. She began her acting career as a small child, in a Paris production of Ernest Legouvé's Medea, sharing the stage with Adelaide Ristori.

Career 
Mariani was a comic and dramatic actress who performed in throughout Europe and toured in the Caribbean and South America. She worked in various theatre companies, including those run by Ermete Novelli and Cesare Rossi. She was head actress with her own touring company from 1894 to 1908, with the other members including her husband , Achille Majeroni, Maria Melato, Ernesto Sabbatini, and Arturo Falconi. In 1898, she was the first actress to play Ibsen's Nora in Uruguay, when she starred in her company's production of A Doll's House in Montevideo. She sat for a portrait by Spanish painter Ramon Casas, who also used her image to illustrate the share certificates for Hispano Suiza Fabrica de Automoviles SA.

Mariani also appeared in a silent film, Situazione comica (1909). A few months before her death in 1914, she performed in Greek classical dramas in Verona, with Gualtiero Tumiati.

Personal life 
Mariani married actor Vittorio Zampieri. She died from heart failure in 1914, aged 45 years, at Castelfranco Veneto.

References

External links 

 
 An autographed picture of Teresina Mariani as a young woman, in the collection of the Cini Foundation's Study Centre for Documentary Research into European Theatre and Opera

1868 births
1914 deaths
Italian actresses
People from Florence